Peter J. Turnbaugh (born ) is a microbiologist and a professor at University of California, San Francisco. He is known for his research on the metabolic activities performed by the trillions of microbes that colonize humans' adult bodies. Turnbaugh and his research group use interdisciplinary approaches in preclinical models and human cohorts to study the mechanisms through which the gut microbiome influences nutrition and pharmacology.

Education
Turnbaugh received a B.A. in Biochemistry, Biophysics, and Molecular Biology from Whitman College and a Ph.D. in Microbial Genetics and Genomics from Washington University in St. Louis.

Career
From 2010 to 2014 he was a Bauer Fellow in the FAS Center for Systems Biology at Harvard University, where he established an independent research group prior to starting his faculty position at the University of California, San Francisco. Notable honors include the Kipnis Award in Biomedical Sciences, the Needleman Pharmacology Prize, the Damon Runyon-Rachleff Innovation Award, the Searle Scholars Award, and the Burroughs Wellcome Fund Investigators in the Pathogenesis of Disease Award.

Selected honors
 2006 National Science Foundation Graduate Fellowship, National Science Foundation
 2009 David M. Kipnis Award in Biomedical Sciences, Washington University in St. Louis
 2010 Philip Needleman Pharmacology Prize, Washington University in St. Louis
 2016 Damon Runyon-Rachleff Innovation Award, Damon Runyon Cancer Research Foundation
 2016 Searle Scholar, Kinship Foundation
 2018 CZ Biohub Investigator, Microbiome Initiative, Chan Zuckerberg Biohub
 2018 American Society for Microbiology Young Investigator Award
 2018 Burroughs Wellcome Fund Investigators in the Pathogenesis of Disease Award
 2020 Tri-institutional partnership for microbiome research pilot awards

References

External links
The Turnbaugh Lab website

21st-century American biologists
1981 births
Living people
Whitman College alumni
Place of birth missing (living people)
Washington University in St. Louis alumni
Harvard Fellows
University of California, San Francisco faculty